Archibald Edward Glover (1859-1954) was a British Protestant Christian missionary in China. He served with the China Inland Mission from 1896 to 1900, when he returned to England with his two children after his wife and youngest daughter died during their flight from the Boxer Rebellion.

Bibliography
  
 Pat Barr, To China with Love: The Lives and Times of Protestant Missionaries in China, 1860-1900 (1972)
 A. J. Broomhall, Hudson Taylor and China's Open Century, vol. 7 (1989)
  
 See also the CIM periodical China's Millions for the years 1900–1904.

References

Further reading
Historical Bibliography of the China Inland Mission

English Protestant missionaries
Protestant missionaries in China
British expatriates in China
Protestant writers
British people of the Boxer Rebellion
1859 births
1954 deaths